The Kearny Scots are an American soccer club based in Kearny, New Jersey. The club presently plays in the Eastern Premier Soccer League, which is a United States Adult Soccer Association-affiliated league and an amateur affiliate of the professional third tier National Independent Soccer Association. The Scots are one of the oldest continuously operating soccer clubs in the United States.

In the Scots' earlier days, they played in both the National Association Football League and the second American Soccer League.  When not members of those leagues, the Scots competed in lower level city leagues.

History
The Scots had been established in the late 19th century and was a founding member of the first National Association Football League (NAFBL).  In 1895, the Scots finished runner up to Bayonne Centerville in the NAFBL's first season.  When the NAFBL folded at the end of the 1898–1899 season, the Scots continued to play in smaller local leagues.  In 1909, the Scots became founding members of the second NAFBL and continued to play in the league until 1918.  They finished runner up in the 1906–1907, 1915–1916, and 1916–1917 seasons.  The Scots began the 1918–1919 season, but the U.S. entry into World War I led to the loss of much of the team.  Consequently, the Scots dropped out the NAFBL five games into the season.

After leaving the NAFBL in 1919, the Scots continued to play in city leagues.  They returned to high level competition when they were an inaugural member of the second American Soccer League in 1933. Originally known as the Scots-Americans, the club was officially renamed the Kearny Americans beginning with the 1941/42 season. The club continued to be better known as the Kearny Scots and returned to their original name before the 1950/51 season.

The club won the New Jersey State Challenge Cup in 1939 and in 1940 took a "double" winning the league and the Lewis Cup. The club won the Lewis Cup again in 1948.

Due to financial difficulties, the Scots withdrew from the American Soccer League after the 1952/53 season.

After playing in state leagues in New Jersey, the Scots re-joined the semi-professional circuit on June 30, 2021 by joining the Eastern Premier Soccer League.

Year-by-year

Honors
American Cup
 Winner (1): 1915
 Runner-up (3): 1907, 1910, 1916

American Soccer League
 Winner (5): 1936–37, 1937–38, 1938–39, 1939–40, 1940–41
 Runner-up (2): 1947–48, 1951–52Lewis Cup Winner (2): 1940, 1948New Jersey Men's Open State Cup Winner (6):''' 1924–25, 1932–33, 1938–39, 1939–40, 1964–65, 1990–91

References

External links
 NAFBL standings

National Association Football League teams
American Soccer League (1933–1983) teams
Soccer clubs in New Jersey
Association football clubs established in 1895
1895 establishments in New Jersey
Scottish-American culture in New Jersey
Kearny, New Jersey
Diaspora soccer clubs in the United States
British association football clubs outside the United Kingdom
Scottish diaspora in North America